Fazil Fanoos (born 6 October 1997) is an Indian cricketer who plays domestic cricket for Kerala. He is a right-arm medium fast bowler.

Career
He made his List A debut for Kerala in the 2017–18 Vijay Hazare Trophy on 13 February 2018. He is part of the KCA Tigers 14-men squad for 2020-21 KCA President's Cup T20.

References

External links
 

1997 births
Living people
Indian cricketers
Place of birth missing (living people)
Kerala cricketers